Girish Rauturi (born 11 August 1997) is an Indian cricketer. He made his first-class debut for Uttarakhand in the 2018–19 Ranji Trophy on 28 November 2018. He made his Twenty20 debut for Uttarakhand in the 2018–19 Syed Mushtaq Ali Trophy on 21 February 2019.

References

External links
 

1997 births
Living people
Indian cricketers
Place of birth missing (living people)
Uttarakhand cricketers